Arkhipovka is a rural locality (a selo) and the administrative center of Arkhipovskoye Rural Settlement, Rossoshansky District, Voronezh Oblast, Russia. The population was 1,336 as of 2010. There are 12 streets.

Geography 
Arkhipovka is located 13 km northwest of Rossosh (the district's administrative centre) by road. Posyolok sovkhoza Rossoshansky is the nearest rural locality.

References 

Rural localities in Rossoshansky District